Sabrina Sato Rahal (born 4 February 1981) is a Brazilian television presenter. She was a contestant on Big Brother Brasil 3 (2003) and a hostess on comedy program Pânico na TV from 2004 until 2013. Since 2014, she has her own show on Record TV.

Personal life
Sabrina Sato was born in Penápolis, São Paulo. Her mother is of Japanese descent, while her father has Swiss and Lebanese ancestry.

Television career

Big Brother Brasil and early career
Sabrina had worked for a year in the dancers of Domingão do Faustão and briefly appeared in the telenovela Porto dos Milagres before being in 2003 chosen as part of the cast of Big Brother Brasil 3, finishing sixth overall. Sabrina reclaimed celebrity by joining Pânico, a comedy troupe that hosts a homonymous radio show on the popular youth-focused radio station Jovem Pan. In the show, Sabrina made fun of her own intellectual limitations and her Caipira accent.

Pânico na TV

In September 2003, a pretty popular radio show in Brazil, Pânico, acquired its own television show, named Pânico na TV, which premiered on Rede TV. Sabrina became the show's main reporter, normally pulling risky or unusual tricks, such as having her body covered with bees, lighting candles by fart, being buried alive, allowing a scorpion to sting her on her bare backside, belching the lyrics to songs/ stories, and even eating bugs.

In 2006, she made headlines by announcing she would leave Pânico. Soon after she released her first single, "É Verdade" (her catchphrase and also "It's true" when translated), talking about her departure. Later, she came back to the show later on and it was revealed that everything was just a publicity stunt. Sabrina remained with Pânico until 2014, one year after their change to Rede Bandeirantes and rename to Pânico na Band.

She posed nude twice for Playboy Brasil, in 2003 after Big Brother, and 2004 as part of Pânico.

Filmography

Television 
Unscripted
 2000-01: Domingão do Faustão...Herself (dancer)
 2003: Big Brother Brasil 3...Herself (participant)
 2003 - 2011: Pânico na TV ...Herself (co-host\reporter)
 2012 - 2013: Pânico na Band...Herself (co-host\reporter)
 2014–19: Programa da Sabrina...Herself (host)
 2020: Domingo Show...Herself (host)
 2020: Made In Japão...Herself (host)
 2020: Game dos Clones... Herself (host)
 2021: Ilha Record... Herself (host)

Scripted
 1989: Cortina de Vidro ... Meg
 2001: Porto dos Milagres ... Tchutchuca
 2020: Reality Z...Divina McCall

Movies 
 2002: Back to Gaya... Princess Alanta (Brazilian Dub)
 2004: A Cartomante ... customer
 2006: Asterix and the Vikings ... Abba (Brazilian Dub)
 2013: O Concurso... Martinha Pinel
 2014: Khumba ... Mama V (Brazilian Dub)
 2014: A Grande Vitória... Daniela

References

External links

 Official website
 Loja Sabrina Sato

1981 births
Living people
People from Penápolis
Brazilian television presenters
Brazilian women television presenters
Big Brother (franchise) contestants
Big Brother Brasil